Zieria formosa, commonly known as the shapely zieria, is a plant in the citrus family Rutaceae and is endemic to a small area on the south coast of New South Wales.  It is a dense, rounded shrub with velvety, clover-like leaves composed of three leaflets. In spring there are clusters of small, pale pink flowers with four petals near the ends of the branches. It is similar to the Box Range zieria (Zieria buxijugum) which has a similar distribution, but has wider leaflets and an appendage on its anthers.

Description
Its younger branches are warty and covered with branched hairs. The leaves appear silvery due to a dense covering of velvety hairs. Clusters of between 25 and 45 pale pink flowers  in diameter are arranged in leaf axils, the clusters slightly shorter than the leaves. The four stamens are tipped with orange-red anthers which have a small appendage.

Taxonomy and naming
Zieria formosa was first formally described in 2002 by John Briggs and James Andrew Armstrong from a specimen collected west of Pambula and the description was published in Australian Systematic Botany. The specific epithet (formosa) is a Latin word meaning "beautifully formed" or "handsome".

Distribution and habitat

Conservation
This zieria is listed as "Critically Endangered" under the New South Wales Threatened Species Conservation Act and as "Endangered" under the Commonwealth Government Environment Protection and Biodiversity Conservation Act 1999 (EPBC) Act.  The main threats to the species are changes to agricultural practices and trampling by livestock.

References

formosa
Sapindales of Australia
Flora of New South Wales
Plants described in 2002